G.S. College of Commerce and Economics, Nagpur (Autonomous), established in 1945, is one of the general degree, first autonomous commerce college, and RUSA Beneficiary Institution in Nagpur, Maharashtra. This college offers undergraduate and postgraduate degree courses in Economics and Commerce. It is affiliated to Rashtrasant Tukadoji Maharaj Nagpur University.

Accreditation
The college is recognized by the University Grants Commission (UGC), has NAAC accreditation, and is a RUSA Beneficiary institution.

References

External links

Colleges affiliated to Rashtrasant Tukadoji Maharaj Nagpur University
Educational institutions established in 1945
1945 establishments in India
Universities and colleges in Maharashtra
Universities and colleges in Nagpur